Torrin Lawrence (April 11, 1989 – July 28, 2014) was an American sprinter who competed in the 400 meters. He ran for the University of Georgia.

Career
Torrin attended Andrew Jackson High School in Jacksonville, Florida, though he did not start competing in track and field until his junior year.

Lawrence ran the three fastest indoor 400m times in the world in 2010 with his 45.03 clocking at the Tyson Invitational, his 45.10 at the SEC Men's Indoor Championships, and his 45.23 at NCAAs. His 45.03 is the seventh fastest indoor 400m in history.
Lawrence held the NCAA record in the indoor 300m, having run 32.32 at the 2010 Hokie Invitational, which was the fifth fastest time in history. The record stood until 2020, when Jacory Patterson ran 32.28 at the Hokie Invitational.

At the 2010 NCAA Men's Indoor Track and Field Championships, Lawrence won the 400m title, clocking a 45.23. Lawrence was named the 2010 National Male Track Athlete of the Year by the U.S. Track and Field Cross Country Coaches Association.

Death
Lawrence died after a tractor-trailer collided with his car on I-75 near Cordele, Georgia, early in the morning of July 28, 2014. Lawrence's car suffered a blowout and came to rest in the traffic lane of I-75 south near exit 94. Lawrence was awaiting assistance from a deputy, when the tractor-trailer hit his car. Lawrence was thrown from the vehicle and killed.

Personal bests

References

External links

1989 births
2014 deaths
American male sprinters
Road incident deaths in Georgia (U.S. state)